The Yuanching Temple is a temple in Changhua City, Changhua County, Taiwan.

History
The temple was constructed in 1763 in which it became the first temple in Taiwan to worship Jade Emperor. In 1887, it underwent renovation in which a grand theater stage was added.

Architecture
The temple was constructed with early years of Qing Dynasty architectural style.

Transportation
The temple is accessible within walking distance southeast of Changhua Station of Taiwan Railways.

See also
 Fengshan Tiangong Temple, Taiwan
 Jade Emperor Pagoda, Vietnam
 Yuk Wong Kung Tin, Hong Kong
 Thni Kong Tnua, Malaysia
 List of temples in Taiwan
 List of tourist attractions in Taiwan

References

1763 establishments in Taiwan
Changhua City
Religious buildings and structures completed in 1763
Temples in Changhua County
Taoist temples in Taiwan
National monuments of Taiwan